Anteojito y Antifaz, mil intentos y un invento (English title: Anteojito and Antifaz, A Thousand Attempts and One Invention) is a 1972 Argentine animated comedy-drama film written and directed by Manuel García Ferré. The film premiered in Argentina on September 14, 1972. It was re-released on July 12, 2001.

Plot
Anteojito is a poor orphan 10-year-old boy who lives with his Uncle Antifaz in an apartment house in a city named Villa Trompeta. Uncle Antifaz tries to invent an invisibility formula with Anteojito's help, and Cachavacha, a witch and Uncle Antifaz's neighbor who lives in the apartment right under his, tries to steal it as revenge for to his explosions destroying her apartment. Anteojito sells some balloons and meets his friend Buzoncito, a little red mailbox. The balloons he was selling escape when he argues with a group of brats who mocked him. The circus comes to town and he helps out a friendly clown and his sick daughter by posing as a second, singing, clown. Two con men named Bodega and Rapiño are impressed by Anteojito's singing and pose as talent agents who can get him lucrative theatrical and operatic engagements, being hired by Cachavacha to have him away from Uncle Antifaz. Bonaño, a good-natured cat (tall with funny hat), takes him to Master Meethoven, a Beethoven-esque feline music teacher. Anteojito becomes a star, but he unknownly lets success go to his head, as he snubs Uncle Antifaz, and dismisses Bodega and Rapiño, who begin fight over the money. The distraught Antifaz gives up his experiments, which are immediately continued disastrously by Cachavacha, who ultimately dies on an explosion. Anteojito is told a story within the film (based on a separate book by García Ferré, El Pararrayos o Historia de una Ambición). This story is about an iron fence spike who was part of a fence that was thrown away in a dumpster. This spike had an ambition to become famous and be notice all the time by the public. The iron spike placed itself on higher positions as time went by, and even fought with a sword for a position on a coat of arms inside a mansion. However, the spike was still not satisfied, and eventually fulfilled its dream by becoming a lightning rod on top of a cathedral, where it was forever alone, and nobody could reach it. At last, Anteojito realizes that wealth is worthless without true friendship. He returns to being a little boy living with Uncle Antifaz, who throws away the invisibility formula he has finally invented.

Production Staff

Crew 
Written, produced and directed by: Manuel García Ferré
Associate co-producer: Julio Korn
Sequence director: Néstor Córdoba
Animators: Natalio Zirulnik, Carlos A. Pérez Agüero, Jorge Benedetti, Alberto Grisolía, Hugo Csecs, Horacio Colombo, Roberto García, Mauro Chitti
Inbetweeners: María Elena Soria, Laureano López, Beatríz Baldi, Susana Macaya, Norberto Burella
Art direction: Hugo Csecs
Backgrounds: Hugo Csecs, Walter Canevaro, Manuel Amigo
Ink and paint supervisors: Néstor Domínguez, Mirta Fassanella
Ink and paint: Elisa Aguiló, Estela Blanco, Inés Erausquín, Marta Di Guillo, Lidia Parón, Susana Solimena, Liliana Tirinello
Cinematography and special effects: Osvaldo Domínguez
Camera: Jorge Somma, Eduardo Chaile, Rubén Lamponi
Music composed and conducted by: Roberto Lar
Sound engineer: Francisco Busso
Sound recordist: Americo Gianello
Edited by: Silvestre Murúa
Negative cutter: Sara Gallego

Cast 
 Anteojito: Marión Tiffemberg
 Antifáz: Pedro Mansilla
 Other voices: Pelusa Suero, Ivan Grey, Inés Geldstein, Néstor D'Alessandro, Enrique Conlazo, Mario Gian, Claudia D'Alessandro, Silvia D'Alessandro, Liliana Mamone

Technical specifications 
Color by: Eastmancolor
Film processing: Laboratorios Alex, S. A.
Sound system: RCA

See also
List of animated feature-length films
El Apóstol (first Argentine animated feature film, 1917)

External links

1972 films
1972 animated films
Argentine animated films
Argentine comedy-drama films
Animated comedy films
Animated drama films
1970s Spanish-language films